Harman Junction is an unincorporated community in Buchanan County, in the U.S. state of Virginia.

References

Unincorporated communities in Virginia
Unincorporated communities in Buchanan County, Virginia